Kateřina Svitková (born 20 March 1996) is a Czech professional footballer who plays as a midfielder for Chelsea of the English FA WSL and the Czech Republic women's national football team. She previously played for West Ham United and Slavia Prague.

Early life
Svitková was born in Plzeň and played with the boys' teams at Viktoria Plzeň.

Club career
Svitková was along Kirsten van de Ven the top assister of the 2015–16 UEFA Women's Champions League, where Slavia reached the quarterfinals. Svitková was named 2015, 2018, 2019 and 2020 Czech Footballer of the Year (women). In the 2016–17 and 2017–18 season she was the top scorer of the Czech Women's First League.

International career
Svitková made her debut for the Czech national team in a February 2014 FIFA World Cup qualifying 6–1 loss against Italy, and went on to lead the team's scoring in those qualifiers with 5 goals.

International goals

International goals

References

External links
 

1996 births
Living people
Czech women's footballers
Czech expatriate women's footballers
Czech Republic women's international footballers
FC Viktoria Plzeň players
Women's association football midfielders
SK Slavia Praha (women) players
Sportspeople from Plzeň
Expatriate women's footballers in England
Czech expatriate sportspeople in England
West Ham United F.C. Women players
Chelsea F.C. Women players
Czech Women's First League players
Women's Super League players